Gilbert Blaize Rego  (3 September 1921 – 21 June 2012) was an Indian Prelate of the Roman Catholic Church.

Rego was born in Mumbai and was ordained a priest on 3 December 1953. Rego was appointed bishop to the Diocese of Simla and Chandigarh on 11 March 1971 and ordained bishop on 11 September 1971. Rego retired on 10 November 1999 as bishop of the Chandigarh and Simla Diocese.

External links
Catholic-Hierarchy
Gilbert Blaize Rego's obituary

20th-century Roman Catholic bishops in India
1921 births
2012 deaths